Walther Hubatsch (17 May 1915 – 29 December 1984) was a German military historian.

He was born in Königsberg in East Prussia. During World War II he served in the German Army. He was appointed professor in Göttingen from 1949, and from 1956 at the University of Bonn. Among his works is a treatment of Operation Weserübung, the German attack on Denmark and Norway in 1940.

References

1915 births
1984 deaths
Writers from Königsberg
20th-century German historians
Academic staff of the University of Göttingen
Academic staff of the University of Bonn